Snainton Preceptory (also known as Foulbridge Priory) was a priory, just south of the village of Snainton, in North Yorkshire, England. The preceptory was started by the Knights Templar at Foulbridge which sits  to the east of a Benedictine Priory at Yedingham. Both houses were on the River Derwent.

The preceptory was founded before 1226, but was suppressed between 1308 and 1312 and passed to the Knights Hospitaller in 1324, as confirmed by Edward II. The preceptory was given to the Archbishop of York in 1556, but it is unclear what happened afterwards. Some of the buildings are now a grade I listed farmhouse and cottage.

References

Monasteries in North Yorkshire
Snainton